Horta is a neighborhood in the Horta-Guinardó district of Barcelona, Catalonia (Spain). It is documented for the first time in 965, in which appears as the valley of Horta. Originally the neighborhood was the main town of the former municipality of Horta which was more or less as the current district limits of Horta-Guinardó. 

Neighbourhoods of Barcelona
Horta-Guinardó